Trenčianska Teplá  is a village and municipality in Trenčín District in the Trenčín Region of north-western Slovakia.

History
In historical records the village was first mentioned in 1155.

Geography
The municipality lies at an altitude of 224 metres and covers an area of 15.133 km². It has a population of about 4035 people.

External links
http://www.statistics.sk/mosmis/eng/run.html

Villages and municipalities in Trenčín District